The Confederation of Trade Unions of Slovenia PERGAM (KSS PERGAM) is a national trade union center in Slovenia. It was created in 1991 as a breakaway union from the Confederation of New Trade Unions of Slovenia "Independence" (KNSS "Independence").

References

External links
 KSS PERGAM official site.

Trade unions in Slovenia
Breakaway trade unions
Trade unions established in 1991
1991 establishments in Slovenia